The 128th Aviation Brigade is an aviation brigade of the United States Army under the United States Army Aviation Center of Excellence at Fort Eustis, Virginia. 

The brigade is composed of:
 1st Battalion, 210th Aviation Regiment
 2nd Battalion, 210th Aviation Regiment
 1st Battalion, 222nd Aviation Regiment

Decorations 

 Armed Forces Expedition - Panama

References

External links 

128th Aviation Brigade at TRADOC

128
Military units and formations established in 2012